Acremodontina translucida is a species of sea snail, a marine gastropod mollusk in the family Trochaclididae, the ataphrids.

Description
The shell grows to a length of 2.5 mm.

Distribution
This marine species occurs off Tasmania in the subtidal zone and offshore.

References

External links
 To World Register of Marine Species
 
 Molluscs of Tasmania: Acremodontina translucida

translucida
Gastropods described in 1915